Juan Rodolfo Villarzú Rohde (born 16 May 1944) is a Chilean politician who served as minister.

References

1944 births
Living people
20th-century Chilean politicians
University of Chile alumni
University of Chicago alumni
Christian Democratic Party (Chile) politicians